Dame Muffy Calder  (née Thomas; born 21 May 1958) is a Canadian-born British computer scientist, Vice-Principal and Head of College of Science and Engineering, and Professor of Formal Methods at the University of Glasgow. From 2012 to 2015 she was Chief Scientific Advisor to the Scottish Government.

Biography
Calder was born Muffy Thomas on 21 May 1958 in Shawinigan, Quebec, Canada to Carmen and Lois (Hallen) van Thomas. She graduated with a BSc degree in computer science from the University of Stirling, and completed a PhD in computational science at the University of St Andrews in 1987 under the supervision of Roy Dyckhoff. She published widely under the surname Thomas prior to her marriage to David Calder in 1998.

She has worked at the University of Glasgow since 1988, and was Dean of Research in the College of Science and Engineering until 2012. She became Chief Scientific Adviser to the Scottish Government on 1 March 2012. Previously Calder has served as Chair of the UK Computing Research Committee and Chair of the British Computer Society Academy of Computing Research Committee. She became Vice-Principal and Head of College of Science and Engineering in 2015. In 2015 she was appointed to the Council of the Engineering and Physical Sciences Research Council.

Research
Calder summarises her research interests as "mathematical modelling and automated reasoning for concurrent, communicating systems". Calder published an influential overview on the feature interaction problem, with more than 300 citations at Google Scholar. Her research has extended to applying computer science methods to biochemical networks and cell signalling in bioinformatics, resulting in a number of papers.

Awards and recognition
Calder was appointed Order of the British Empire (OBE) in the 2011 New Year Honours for services to computer science and Dame Commander of the Order of the British Empire (DBE) in the 2020 Birthday Honours for services to research and education.

She holds fellowships of the Royal Society of Edinburgh (2000), the British Computer Society (2002), the Institution of Electrical Engineers (2002) and the Royal Academy of Engineering (2013).

Calder was listed as 21st most influential woman in Scotland, 2012, by The Herald.

References

Living people
Scottish computer scientists
Scottish women scientists
Fellows of the Royal Society of Edinburgh
Civil servants in the Scottish Government
British women computer scientists
Alumni of the University of Stirling
Alumni of the University of St Andrews
Academics of the University of Glasgow
Dames Commander of the Order of the British Empire
1958 births
Fellows of the Royal Academy of Engineering
Female Fellows of the Royal Academy of Engineering
Fellows of the British Computer Society
Fellows of the Institution of Engineering and Technology
21st-century women engineers
Scottish women academics